Drymaeus  inconspicuus is a species of  tropical air-breathing land snail, a pulmonate gastropod mollusk in the family Bulimulidae.

Distribution 

 Peru

Description 
Adult specimens of Drymaeus inconspicuus can measure up to 25 mm shell height. The species is characterized by the corneous-brown upper whorls and the suture, which is bordered by a white line, descending slightly in front.

Haas (1949) compared this species to Bulimulus transparens (Reeve, 1849), stating that his material was slightly smaller (17 vs. 19 mm shell height). The type material of Bulimulus transparens is in the Natural History Museum (BMNH 1975397) and is labelled ‘Venezuela’ (Breure, 1978: 147). If this locality is correct, a close relationship as suggested by Haas seems improbable.

References
This article incorporates CC-BY-3.0 text from the reference 

Bulimulus
Gastropods described in 1949